Manzaz volcanic field is a volcanic field in Algeria. It consists of scoria cones with lava flows and has been active until recently.

Geography and geomorphology 

The field lies in Hoggar, close to the Atakor volcanic field. A dome-like uplift has been associated with the volcanism in the region. The presence of volcanism has been explained by tectonic events associated with the collision between Europe and Africa, and the resulting reactivation of ancient tectonic lineaments.

Many of these have breaches and are heavily eroded. The cones were strombolianically active and have erupted lava flows. Volcanic ash and pyroclastics are also found. They are surrounded by tuffs and natron is found at the bottom of the larger crater.

Geology 

The basement consists of metamorphic and plutonic rocks of Precambrian age, which are part of the Tuareg shield. Outcrops of granite are found in some places. These were first buried by tholeiitic basalts between 35 and 30 million years ago.

The field has mostly erupted basalt and basanite. Xenoliths include peridotite and pyroxenite, and amphibole and feldspar form megacrysts in the rocks. Xenoliths appear to, in part, originate from a metasomatized mantle.

Eruptive history 

Three phases of volcanic activity have been distinguished at Manzaz, the first between 20 and 12 million years ago, the second between 7 and 4 million years ago and the third between 3 and 0.01 million years ago. Volcanic activity continued into the Holocene. Some young volcanoes developed on terraces of Neolithic age.

References

Sources 

 
 

Volcanic fields
Holocene volcanoes
Volcanoes of Algeria